Communist Organisation of India (Marxist–Leninist) was a political organisation in India. COI (ML) was formed in May 1985 through the merger of six different groups;

Organising Committee of Communist Revolutionaries led by Kanu Sanyal
Communist Party of India (Marxist-Leninist) Kaimur Range led by Ravi Shankar.
Central Organising Committee, Communist Party of India (Marxist–Leninist) led by Umadhar Singh
A faction of Unity Centre of Communist Revolutionaries of India (Marxist–Leninist) led by Subodh Mitra
Indian Communist Party led by U. Krishnappa
Liberation Front led by Sabuj Sen

Kanu Sanyal was elected general secretary of COI (ML). COI (ML) participated in elections.

In 2003 COI (ML) merged with Communist Party of India (Marxist–Leninist) Unity Initiative to form a unified CPI (ML).

National question
COI (ML) held the position that India was multi-national, in which some nationalities dominated the government and suppressed less advanced national groups. The organisation supported the right to self-determination of Jammu & Kashmir, Nagaland and Mizoram.

References

Political parties established in 1985
Defunct communist parties in India
1985 establishments in India
Political parties disestablished in 2003